Eduard Akuvaev (February 25, 1945 – April 24, 2015) was a Soviet/Russian–Israeli artist and teacher of Mountain Jew descent. He was awarded titles of the Honored Art Worker of Dagestan, Honored Artist of Dagestan. He was awarded the Khalilbek Musaev award. Several of his works are in the National Museum of the Republic of Dagestan in Makhachkala, the Dagestan Museum of Fine Arts and the Derbent State Museum-Reserve.

Biography
Eduard Akuvaev was born in Makhachkala to an intellectual family (ru: интеллигентной семьи). 
Akuvaev's serious attraction to art began at the Dagestan Art School named after Muetdin Arabi Dzhemal, where he entered after the eighth grade of a comprehensive school.
After graduation, he was sent to study at The Surikov Art Institute in Moscow (ru:Московский Художественный Институт имени Сурикова).

He often visited Tretyakov Gallery to learn from the Old Masters. Akuvaev was influenced by Anthony van Dyck, Diego Velázquez, Ivan Kramskoi, Vincent van Gogh, Pierre-Auguste Renoir.

After completed his studies, Akuvaev returned to Makhachkala, to teach in the school. In 1973 he was invited to work at the Dagestan Pedagogical Institute at the Faculty of Graphic Arts. He worked as a senior instructor and assistant professor of the Department of Painting.

As a teacher, Akuvaev combined teaching with creative activity. He painted (ruНатюрморт с репродукцией Шардена») - "Still life with reproduction of Chardin”. The attributes for his painting, Akuvaev used old things of his grandmother; a copper basin, a rug and a Sulevkent's jug. These antiques connected the artist with Chardin, whom Akuvaev loved and revered very much. The painting was exhibited at the "South Zone" exhibition, and then it was bought by the Dagestan Museum of Fine Arts, where the painting is to this day.

In the 1970s, the artist took part in many exhibitions. Thus, the painting (ru:«Портрет бабушки») - "Portrait of Grandmother" was exhibited at the 5th All-Russian Exhibition in Moscow in 1975.

In 1977, Akuvaev was admitted to the Union of Artists of the USSR.

A. Taho-Godi National Museum of the Republic of Dagestan in Makhachkala and fund of Imam Shamil commissioned Akuvaev to paint portraits of imam Ghazi Muhammad and Avar leader Hadji Murad. In 1992 artist completed both portraits that are located at A. Taho-Godi National Museum of the Republic of Dagestan. Akuvaev painted Hadji Murad from the drawing of Grigory Gagarin and named it (ru:«Хаджи-Мурат на фоне села Хунзах») - "Hadji Murad Against the Background of the Village of Khunzakh." Both portraits are based on historical figures.

Akuvaev worked in Dagestan with a large publishing house "Daguchpedgiz". In 1985 he illustrated books for the story (ru:«А зори здесь тихие…») - "The Dawns Here Are Quiet..." by Boris Vasiliev and for the novel "Dick Sand, A Captain at Fifteen" by Jules Verne.

Akuvaev worked more than 20 years at the graphic arts department of the Dagestan Pedagogical Institute, but art occupied a significant place in his life.

In 1995 Akuvaev immigrated to Israel with his family.

He took part in many group exhibitions, including “Artists from Netanya” (1996), ”Artists from the Caucasus for the 40th Anniversary of Upper Nazareth” (1998), "Artists from the Caucasus in Netanya" (1999), “Artists from the Caucasus in Merkaz ha-music” (Tel Aviv, 2000) and "Artists from the Caucasus in the Jerusalem Museum" (2001).

In Israel, the artist's work was popular. The style and technique of the painter did not change throughout the artist's career, and this satisfied the customers.

In Israel, he was a member of the Israel Artists' Union.

The works of Eduard Akuvaev are kept in the Dagestan Art Fund, in museums, private collections in Russia, Israel and USA.

Awards
Honored Artist of Dagestan
Honored Art Worker of Dagestan 
Khalilbek Musaev award

References

External links
Eduard Akuvaev. His life belonged to art.
Eduard Izmailovich Akuvaev - Baruch Dayan HaEmet!

1945 births
People from Makhachkala
Russian Jews
Mountain Jews
Jewish painters
Modern artists
Modern painters
Russian emigrants to Israel
20th-century Russian male artists
21st-century Russian male artists
20th-century Russian painters
21st-century Russian painters
Soviet artists
20th-century Israeli male artists
21st-century Israeli male artists
2015 deaths